Ary Anthony Hoffmann  is an Australian entomologist and geneticist who studied at Monash University and La Trobe University. He is the chair of ecological genetics and Melbourne Laureate Professor at the University of Melbourne. and leads the Pest & Environmental Adaptation Research Group at the University of Melbourne Bio21 Institute.

On Australia Day 2022, Hoffmann was appointed Companion of the Order of Australia "for eminent service to science, particularly evolutionary biology and ecological genetics, through research, mentoring and education, and to professional scientific organisations".

Research 
Hoffmann's work in evolutionary biology is focused on applying its principles to solve modern problems. Areas of Hoffmann's research include climate change adaptation and endosymbionts. Hoffmann's work is highly cited and prolific.

References 

Living people
Year of birth missing (living people)
Australian ichthyologists
Companions of the Order of Australia
Fellows of the Australian Academy of Science
Scientists from Melbourne
University of Queensland alumni
Monash University alumni
La Trobe University alumni
Academic staff of the University of Melbourne